Debreceni Vasutas Sport Club is a professional Hungarian football club, based in Debrecen, Hungary.

Managerial history
  Imre Béki (11 October 1920 – 28 February 1921)
  István Vampetich (1 July 1921 – 31 December 1925)
  Béla Szolárszky & Gyula Lindenberger (1930–36)
  István Vampetich (1 September 1936 – 30 July 1937)
  Merényi Lajos (1 August 1937 – 31 July 1938)
  Rudolf Keviczky (1 August 1938 – 30 June 1939)
  Ferenc Sipos (1 August 1938 – 30 July 1940)
  István Sidlik (1 September 1939 – 30 November 1939)
  István Palotás (1 August 1940 – 15 February 1942)
  Géza Nagy (16 February 1942 – 30 April 1942)
  Lajos Wéber (1 May 1942 – 18 October 1942)
  István Palotás (20 October 1942 – 15 July 1943)
  János Móré (20 July 1943 – 30 September 1944)
  István Palotás (1 February 1945 – 12 March 1945)
  Mihály Orosz (13 March 1945 – 25 September 1945)
  István Palotás (26 September 1945 – 31 August 1947)
  Imre Markos (1 September 1947 – 9 May 1948)
  Endre Szabó I (10 May 1948 – 30 June 1948)
  István Palotás (1 July 1948 – 18 March 1950)
  Dezső Kántor (20 March 1950 – 28 September 1950)
  János Móré (1 October 1950 – 10 June 1952)
  Ferenc Rátkai (int.) (11 June 1952 – 30 July 1952)
   Géza Kalocsay and Elek Szilárd (1 August 1952 – 30 June 1953)
  Antal Lyka (1 July 1953 – 31 December 1954)
  István Palotás (1 January 1955 – 30 June 1957)
  János Móré (1 July 1957 – 10 March 1959)
  András Tisza (1959)
  Gyula Teleki (1959–61)
  Ferenc Magyar
  Antal Lyka (1962–63)
  Gyula Lóránt (1963)
  Gyula Domán
  György Szűcs (1964–65)
  Imre Komlóssy
  Nándor Bányai
  István Sidlik
  László Sárosi (1968)
  András Nagyszalóki
  István Pyber
  János Nagy
  László Leányvári
  Béla Marosvári (1973–74)
  László Leányvári (1974)
  Balázs Makray (1975–78)
  Gyula Teleki (1978–80)
  Ferenc Kovács (1980–83)
  Károly Lakat (1983)
  Tamás Kertész (1983–84)
  György Nagy (1984)
  Gábor Petróczi (1984–85)
  Lajos Puskás (1985–87)
  László Kiss (1987)
  Ferenc Vaczlavik (1987–88)
  Miklós Temesvári (1988–90)
  Béla Szabó (1990)
  Elemér Nagykaposi (1990–91)
  Ferenc Ebedli (1992)
  Lajos Garamvölgyi (1993–96)
  Antal Dunai (1996–97)
  András Herczeg (1997–98)
  Lajos Garamvölgyi (1998–00)
  András Komjáti (2000–01)
  János Pajkos (2001)
  László Dajka (2002)
  Lázár Szentes (2002–04)
  Attila Supka (2004–06)
  Miroslav Beránek (2006–07)
  András Herczeg (2007–10)
  Zdeněk Ščasný (1 January 2011 – 20 April 2011)
  Elemér Kondás (20 April 2011 – 25 July 2016)
  András Herczeg (interim)
  Leonel Pontes (8 August 2016 – 22 May 2017)
  András Herczeg (22 May 2017 – 27 December 2019)
  Zoltán Vitelki (30 December 2019 – 7 June 2020)
  Elemér Kondás (7 June 2020 – 16 February 2021)
  Szabolcs Huszti & Gábor Toldi (16 February 2021 – 28 October 2021)
  Joan Carrillo (8 November 2021 – 27 June 2022)
  João Janeiro (27 June 2022-31 August 2022)
 Srdjan Blagojevic (21 September 2022-present)

References

External links

Debreceni VSC